Aghanliss is a townland in County Antrim, Northern Ireland. It is situated in the historic barony of Massereene Upper and the civil parish of Ballinderry and covers an area of 341 acres

The population of the townland decreased during the 19th century:

See also 
List of townlands in County Antrim

References

Townlands of County Antrim
Civil parish of Ballinderry (Massereene Upper)